Oskar Awejde (1837–1897) was a Polish jurist. He was a member of the Red faction during the January Uprising.

1837 births
1897 deaths
Polish jurists